Nikolai Yefremovich Avkhimovich (14 January 1907 – 12 September 1996) was a Soviet and Belarusian politician. He served as the Chairman of the Council of Ministers of the Byelorussian Soviet Socialist Republic from 28 July 1956 to 9 April 1959. He was a member of the Central Committee of the Communist Party of the Soviet Union from 1956 until 1961.

Further reading in Russian 
 Государственная власть СССР. Высшие органы власти и управления и их руководители. 1923—1991 гг. Историко-биографический справочник./Сост. В. И. Ивкин. Москва, 1999. — 

1907 births
1996 deaths
People from Barysaw
People from Borisovsky Uyezd
Central Committee of the Communist Party of the Soviet Union members
Second convocation members of the Soviet of Nationalities
Third convocation members of the Soviet of Nationalities
Fourth convocation members of the Soviet of Nationalities
Fifth convocation members of the Soviet of Nationalities
Members of the Central Committee of the Communist Party of Byelorussia
Heads of government of the Byelorussian Soviet Socialist Republic
Members of the Supreme Soviet of the Byelorussian SSR (1938–1946)
Members of the Supreme Soviet of the Byelorussian SSR (1947–1950)
Members of the Supreme Soviet of the Byelorussian SSR (1951–1954)
Members of the Supreme Soviet of the Byelorussian SSR (1955–1959)
Members of the Supreme Soviet of the Byelorussian SSR (1959–1962)
Members of the Supreme Soviet of the Byelorussian SSR (1962–1966)
Members of the Supreme Soviet of the Byelorussian SSR (1967–1970)
Members of the Supreme Soviet of the Byelorussian SSR (1971–1974)
Recipients of the Order of Lenin
Recipients of the Order of the Red Banner

Recipients of the Order of the Red Banner of Labour